William Todd Bell (17 March 1905 – 1937) was an English professional footballer who played as a full-back. He played five times for Sheffield United in the Football League First Division.

References

1905 births
1937 deaths
Sportspeople from Ashington
Footballers from Northumberland
English footballers
Association football fullbacks
Blyth Spartans A.F.C. players
Sheffield United F.C. players
Grimsby Town F.C. players
Hull City A.F.C. players
English Football League players